Bodzanów may refer to the following places:

Bodzanów, Lesser Poland Voivodeship (south Poland)
Bodzanów, Masovian Voivodeship (east-central Poland)
Bodzanów, Opole Voivodeship (south-west Poland)